The Kashmir nuthatch (Sitta cashmirensis) is a species of bird in the family Sittidae. It is found in the northernmost regions of the Indian subcontinent, primarily in the mid-altitudes of the Himalayas.  The species ranges across Afghanistan, India, Nepal and Pakistan. The global population size has not been quantified, but the species is described as common in eastern Afghanistan and north-western India, and fairly common in Nepal (Harrap and Quinn 1996).

Habitat
It makes its home in the subtropical and tropical humid montane forests. It prefers a high altitude, from 1,800 to 3,350 meters.

Description
This bird measures 14 cm (5.5 in) long and has mostly grey upper parts, reddish underparts and a pale throat and chin.

References

Kashmir nuthatch
Birds of Afghanistan
Birds of North India
Birds of Nepal
Birds of Pakistan
Kashmir nuthatch
Kashmir nuthatch
Kashmir nuthatch
Taxonomy articles created by Polbot